Jorge Miguel de Oliveira Ribeiro (born 9 November 1981) is a Portuguese retired professional footballer. Mainly a left-back, he could also play as a wing-back or midfielder.

He totalled 118 Primeira Liga games and 15 goals, for six clubs including two spells at Benfica, and added 185 appearances in LigaPro for as many teams. Additionally, he had stints in Russia with Dynamo Moscow and in Spain.

Ribeiro earned 30 caps for Portugal at youth level, and represented the country at Euro 2008.

Club career

Early career
Born in Lisbon, Ribeiro was brought up in S.L. Benfica's youth system. In 2002, he was one of three young players sold to fellow Primeira Liga club Varzim SC, along with Rui Baião and Pepa. In January 2005, after angering his employers Gil Vicente F.C. by an unauthorised absence, he was purchased by the Russian Premier League's FC Dynamo Moscow; unadjusted, he left the team precisely a year after, joining La Liga side Málaga CF until the end of the season, which ended in relegation.

Ribeiro returned to Portugal in January 2007, joining C.D. Aves still on loan from the Russians. On 4 February he made his debut for his new club in a 1–0 away loss against S.C. Braga, as the team he represented again dropped down a level. He would be purchased by Boavista F.C. in July and blossomed as a top-flight player, scoring eight league goals during his only campaign, many from free kicks.

Return to Benfica
On 24 July 2008, Ribeiro returned to Benfica after a deal was agreed upon in April. Having scored his first goal for them on 22 September in a 4–3 win at F.C. Paços de Ferreira, he eventually became first-choice left-back, overtaking Brazilian Léo.

However, Ribeiro soon lost his starting place to David Luiz, and eventually was deemed surplus to requirements. In the 2009–10 season, as Benfica won the league and the League Cup, he did not play a single competitive match, often training separately and choosing to see out his lucrative contract rather than signing with another club.

On 16 August 2011, after spending five months on loan to Vitória de Guimarães, Ribeiro signed for two years with Granada CF on a free transfer. He only made one official appearance with the Andalusians – 55 minutes against Real Sociedad in the round of 32 of the Copa del Rey (4–1 away defeat)– losing his No. 16 jersey in the winter transfer window and being released from contract on 17 February 2012.

Later years
In the summer of 2013, after more than one year out of football, Ribeiro returned to active, penning a one-year contract with S.C. Olhanense but being released less than one month later, still during pre-season play. He subsequently returned to Aves, where he was a regular until his departure.

Ribeiro signed a one-year deal with Atlético Clube de Portugal also of the LigaPro in July 2015. After the season ended with relegation to the third tier, he moved to S.C. Farense at that level. After scoring six times in 30 games to win promotion in his second year, he extended his contract until 30 June 2019.

In July 2019, the 37-year-old Ribeiro joined Casa Pia A.C. in his hometown, newly promoted to division two. He and captain João Coito rescinded their contracts the following February; Ribeiro, who left due to disputes with new manager Ricardo Peres, retired to spend time with his family instead of taking offers to move to Brazil.

International career
Ribeiro made his debut for Portugal in November 2002, against Scotland. He was part of the under-23 team that was eliminated in the group stage at the 2004 Summer Olympics in Greece.

Ribeiro did not play a senior game again until a 2–2 draw away to Liechtenstein in October 2004. After another two-year absence, he was again called and played as a replacement for right-back José Bosingwa in UEFA Euro 2008 qualifiers against Azerbaijan and Kazakhstan on 13 and 17 October, respectively.

With eight caps, Ribeiro was selected for the squad that competed in the finals in Austria and Switzerland, as older brother Maniche was left out. He appeared as a substitute in the last group stage match against Switzerland, a 2–0 loss that would be his final international.

Personal life
Jorge's older brother, Nuno, was also a footballer. A midfielder, he represented, among others, Benfica, FC Porto and Chelsea, and the two were teammates at Dynamo Moscow.

Career statistics

Club

Honours
Benfica
Taça da Liga: 2008–09

Vitória Guimarães
Taça de Portugal runner-up: 2010–11

Portugal U-21
Toulon Tournament: 2001

References

External links
 
 
 
 
 

1981 births
Living people
Portuguese footballers
Footballers from Lisbon
Association football defenders
Association football midfielders
Primeira Liga players
Liga Portugal 2 players
Segunda Divisão players
S.L. Benfica B players
S.L. Benfica footballers
C.D. Santa Clara players
Varzim S.C. players
Gil Vicente F.C. players
C.D. Aves players
Boavista F.C. players
Vitória S.C. players
Atlético Clube de Portugal players
S.C. Farense players
Casa Pia A.C. players
Russian Premier League players
FC Dynamo Moscow players
La Liga players
Málaga CF players
Granada CF footballers
Portugal youth international footballers
Portugal under-21 international footballers
Portugal international footballers
UEFA Euro 2008 players
Olympic footballers of Portugal
Footballers at the 2004 Summer Olympics
Portuguese expatriate footballers
Expatriate footballers in Russia
Expatriate footballers in Spain
Portuguese expatriate sportspeople in Russia
Portuguese expatriate sportspeople in Spain